Colasposoma auripes is a species of leaf beetles of East Africa and the Democratic Republic of the Congo, described by Martin Jacoby in 1894.

Subspecies
There are two subspecies of C. auripes:

 Colasposoma auripes auripes Jacoby, 1894: nominotypical subspecies
 Colasposoma auripes kafakumbae Burgeon, 1941

References

auripes
Beetles of the Democratic Republic of the Congo
Taxa named by Martin Jacoby
Beetles described in 1894